Mahmutlar is a town in the Turkish province Antalya, 10 km east of Alanya. Population: 15,000 in the winter, 60,000 in the summer. The town has been transformed by the building of holiday homes and apartments for European tourists.  Roads and services have been improved to cater for the growing tourist industry.

External links

Photos and videos
 
https://archive.today/20130407161455/http://alanya.com.co/mahmutlar-beach/mahmutlar/

Mahmutlar Beach
The sea and beach is sandy, while some points are full of burstones. A part of the nearly five kilometers long beach is natural. It is free to enter the beach.

Towns in Turkey
Populated places in Antalya Province